Weilerbach is a Verbandsgemeinde ("collective municipality") in the district of Kaiserslautern, Rhineland-Palatinate, Germany. The seat of the Verbandsgemeinde is in Weilerbach.

The Verbandsgemeinde Weilerbach consists of the following Ortsgemeinden ("local municipalities"):

 Erzenhausen
 Eulenbis
 Kollweiler
 Mackenbach
 Reichenbach-Steegen
 Rodenbach
 Schwedelbach
 Weilerbach

Verbandsgemeinde in Rhineland-Palatinate